William Andrew Pataky (May 12, 1930 – June 24, 2004) was a Canadian basketball player who competed in the 1952 Summer Olympics.

Born in Windsor, Ontario, he was part of the Canadian basketball team, which was eliminated after the group stage in the 1952 tournament. He played all six matches. Pataky attended the University of Western Ontario and graduated from the University of Windsor in 1957.

References

1930 births
2004 deaths
Basketball players at the 1952 Summer Olympics
Canadian men's basketball players
Olympic basketball players of Canada
Basketball players from Windsor, Ontario
University of Windsor alumni
Western Mustangs basketball players